Maloney Field at Laird Q. Cagan Stadium is a soccer-specific stadium on the campus of Stanford University in Stanford, California. The stadium hosts the Stanford Cardinal men's and women's soccer teams, as well as the women's lacrosse team. The facility opened in 1973, and featured renovations in 1997 and 2011. 

In addition to Cardinal matches, the stadium has been used as a practice training ground for the United States men's and women's national soccer team. The stadium has also been used as a venue for Major League Soccer's San Jose Earthquakes for practices and U.S. Open Cup fixtures. 

The current capacity since the 2011 renovation is 2,952.

References

External links 
 Maloney Field at Laird Q. Cagan Stadium

Sports venues in Santa Clara County, California
Stanford University buildings and structures
Sports venues in the San Francisco Bay Area
College soccer venues in California
College soccer venues in the United States
1973 establishments in California
Sports venues completed in 1973